Angus Ellis Taylor (October 13, 1911 – April 6, 1999) was a mathematician and professor at various universities in the University of California system. He earned his undergraduate degree at Harvard summa cum laude in 1933 and his PhD at Caltech in 1936 under Aristotle Michal with a dissertation on analytic functions. By 1944 he had risen to full professor at UCLA, whose mathematics department he later chaired (1958–1964). Taylor was also an astute administrator and eventually rose through the UC system to become provost and then chancellor of UC Santa Cruz. He authored a number of mathematical texts, one of which, Advanced Calculus (1955 originally published by Ginn/Blaisdell), became a standard for a generation of mathematics students.

Books
 
 Sherwood, G. E. F.; Taylor, Angus E. (1942; 3rd ed., 1954). Calculus. Prentice-Hall

References

External links
 Personal website at University of California, Berkeley
 
 Obituary in the San Francisco Chronicle
 Photographs of Angus Taylor from the UC Santa Cruz Library's Digital Collections

1911 births
1999 deaths
Harvard University alumni
20th-century American mathematicians
Chancellors of the University of California, Santa Cruz
20th-century American academics